Lo svitato is a 1956 Italian comedy film directed by Carlo Lizzani.

Cast 

Dario Fo: Achille
Franca Rame: Diana
Giorgia Moll: Elena
Leo Pisani: Gigi
Alberto Bonucci: Traffic policeman
Franco Parenti: 'Via Emilia Monster'
Umberto D'Orsi: Journalist 
Carlo Bagno
Giustino Durano
Jacopo Fo

References

External links

1956 films
Films directed by Carlo Lizzani
Italian comedy films
1956 comedy films
1950s Italian films
Italian black-and-white films